The 2012–13 VfL Bochum season is the 75th season in club history. In 2012–13 the club plays in the 2. Bundesliga, the second tier of German football. It is the clubs third consecutive season in this league, having played at this level since 2010–11, after it was relegated from the Bundesliga in 2010.

Review and events
On 28 October 2012, Andreas Bergmann was sacked and replaced by Karsten Neitzel.

Marcel Maltritz set a new record for the number of 2. Bundesliga appearances for the club. After Maltritz tied Dariusz Wosz's old record of 107 appearances on 1 December 2012 against 1. FC Union Berlin, he broke it on 16 December 2012 with his appearance against SC Paderborn 07.

During the winter break, the club mourned the death of long-time club official Werner Altegoer, who died on 9 January 2013.

On 8 April 2013, after a string of bad results and the danger of relegation, Peter Neururer replaced Neitzel as the manager of VfL Bochum.

Matches

Legend

Friendly matches

2. Bundesliga

DFB-Pokal

Squad

Squad and statistics

Squad, appearances and goals scored

Minutes played

Bookings

Transfers

Summer

In:

Out:

Winter

In:

Out:

Trials
Carlos da Silva (FC Lugano) and Sehar Fejzulahi (free agent) had trial spells with Bochum during the summer transfer window.

Sources

External links
 2012–13 VfL Bochum season at Weltfussball.de 
 2012–13 VfL Bochum season at kicker.de 
 2012–13 VfL Bochum season at Fussballdaten.de 

Bochum
VfL Bochum seasons